Love at Second Sight is a 2019 French-Belgian romantic comedy film directed by Hugo Gélin, starring François Civil, Joséphine Japy and Benjamin Lavernhe. The film made its world premiere at the L'Alpe d'Huez Film Festival on 18 January 2019, where Civil received the Best Actor award. It was released theatrically in France by Mars Films on 3 April 2019. It won the Swann d'Or for Best Film at the 2019 Cabourg Film Festival. Benjamin Lavernhe was nominated for the César Award for Best Supporting Actor for his performance in the film.

Plot 
Raphaël is a student who writes a science fiction novel during his school lessons, but doesn't dare showing it to anyone. One day he falls in love with Olivia, another student, who is a promising pianist. Raphaël rewrites his novel, incorporating a new character based on Olivia. With Olivia's help, Raphaël becomes a famous sci-fi writer. The two marry, but soon Raphaël gradually distances himself from Olivia, who abandons her career path and becomes a school music teacher.

One evening, Raphaël, finalising his sequel novel, decides to kill off the female character he based on Olivia, and on the same night, he has a huge argument with her. After a snowstorm, the next morning, Raphaël finds himself in a parallel world in which Olivia has never met him and doesn't even know who he is. In this world, she is now a successful and famous pianist while he is a literature teacher who has never completed his novel.

Having realised what has happened, Raphaël attempts to return to his former world. With the help of his best friend Félix, he learns more about his life in this world and manages to talk to Olivia. However, he discovers she is now in a relationship with her manager, Marc. Under the false pretext of writing her biography, Raphaël spends more time with Olivia and makes her fall for him again. Still, Olivia accepts Marc's proposal when he asks her to marry him, and tells Raphaël she wishes she met him years ago.

In a last attempt to get his life back, Raphaël rewrites his sequel novel with a different end, and guesses that Olivia reading it may be the key to reverse the reality. He then gives it to Olivia and asks her to read it as a last favour. When she starts reading the novel, it begins to snow like the night they had the argument. As a result, Raphaël understands his theory is working. But, as he is reminiscing his whole love story with Olivia, he realises she is maybe better off without him. While Olivia is performing on stage, he takes back the novel before she can finish it, and chooses to stay in this world where Olivia appears happier. At the end, Olivia decides to leave Marc, and joins Raphaël to kiss him in a final scene.

Cast 
 François Civil as Raphaël
 Joséphine Japy as Olivia
 Benjamin Lavernhe as Félix, Raphaël's best friend
 Camille Lellouche as Mélanie, Raphaël's one night stand
 Édith Scob as Gabrielle, Olivia's grandmother
 Amaury de Crayencour as Marc, Olivia's possible future husband
 Juliette Dol as Morgane, Félix's partner
 Samir Boitard as literature teacher
 Christian Benedetti as Étienne Robert, editor
 Laurent Delahousse as himself
 Franck Provost as himself

Filming 
Filming took place in Paris between 16 January 2018 and 18 March 2018.

Reception 
AlloCiné, a French cinema website, gave the film an average rating of 3.9/5, based on a survey of 25 French reviews.

Box office  
The film debuted at number 5 at the French box office, with 209,564 admissions. It sold a total of 559,126 tickets after 13 weeks in cinemas in France and grossed $5.9 million worldwide.

Love at Second Sight was the first French film to be released in China since the COVID-19 pandemic. It was the second most successful French film at the international box office (behind The Wolf and the Lion) in April 2022. It garnered 261,000 admissions and €1.17 million at the Chinese box office until December 2022.

Awards and nominations

References

External links 
 
 

2019 films
2019 romantic comedy films
French romantic comedy films
Belgian romantic comedy films
French-language Belgian films
Alternate timeline films
Films directed by Hugo Gélin
2010s French films
Films set in Paris
Films set in the 2000s
Films set in the 2010s
Films about pianos and pianists
Films about writers
Films shot in Paris